Abdulnasyrovo (Äbdelnasir) is a rural locality (a village) in Tselinny Selsoviet of Khaybullinsky District, Bashkortostan, Russia. The population was 150 as of 2010. There is 1 street.

Geography 
Abdulnasyrovo is located 65 km north of Akyar (the district's administrative centre) by road. Rafikovo is the nearest rural locality.

Ethnicity 
The village is inhabited by Bashkirs.

References 

Rural localities in Khaybullinsky District